Quentin Charles Sondergaard (January 11, 1925 – February 15, 1984) was an American film and television actor. He was known for playing Deputy Sheriff Quint in the American western television series Tombstone Territory.

Career 
Sondergaard began his career in 1951, first appearing in the film Badman's Gold, where he played Rambo. Later in his career, Sondergaard guest-starred in television programs including Gunsmoke, Zane Grey Theatre, Wagon Train, Death Valley Days, The Life and Legend of Wyatt Earp, Bat Masterson, The Wild Wild West and Bonanza. He also appeared and co-starred in films, such as, The Miracle, This Property Is Condemned, Five Guns to Tombstone and Gunfight in Abilene. Sondergaard retired in 1982, last appearing in the film The Ghost Dance, where he played the campus guard.

Personal life 
Sondergaard died in February 1984 in Riverside County, California, at the age of 59.

Filmography

Film

Television

References

External links 

Rotten Tomatoes profile

1925 births
1984 deaths
People from Seattle
Male actors from Seattle
American male film actors
American male television actors
20th-century American male actors
Western (genre) television actors
Male Western (genre) film actors